The Charles H. Lockhardt House is a historic house in Somerville, Massachusetts, United States.  Charles H. Lockhardt, a prosperous undertaker in Somerville, built this -story wood-frame Queen Anne style house in c. 1890.  Its most prominent feature is its turret, a three-story polygonal projection from the southeast corner of the building, which is capped by a finial-topped roof.  The property includes a period carriage house, which features a cupola.

The house was listed on the National Register of Historic Places in 1989.

See also
National Register of Historic Places listings in Somerville, Massachusetts

References

Houses on the National Register of Historic Places in Somerville, Massachusetts